Tepecik may refer to:

Places in Turkey
Tepecik, Aydın
Tepecik, Beşiri
Tepecik, Bismil
Tepecik, Eğil
Tepecik, Gercüş
Tepecik, İspir
Tepecik, Karacasu
Tepecik, Kocaköy
Tepecik, Maden
Tepecik, Manyas
Tepecik, Mustafakemalpaşa
Tepecik, Pasinler
Tepecik, Tut

Other
Tepecik B.S., Turkish sports club